Daour M'baye Guèye (born 29 May 1937) is a Senegalese sprinter. He competed in the 4 × 400 metres relay at the 1964 Summer Olympics and the 1968 Summer Olympics.

References

External links
 

1937 births
Living people
Athletes (track and field) at the 1964 Summer Olympics
Athletes (track and field) at the 1968 Summer Olympics
Senegalese male sprinters
Olympic athletes of Senegal
Place of birth missing (living people)